The 2014 Illinois judicial elections consisted of both partisan and retention elections, including those one seat of the Supreme Court of Illinois for ten seats in the Illinois Appellate Court. Primary elections were held on March 18, 2014, and general elections were held on November 4, 2014. These elections were part of the 2014 Illinois elections.

Supreme Court of Illinois
Justices of the Supreme Court of Illinois are elected by district. One seat held a retention election.

The court has seven seats total separated into five districts. The first district, representing Cook County, contains three seats, making it a multi-member district, while other four districts are single-member districts. Justices hold ten year terms.

Retention elections
To be retained, judges were required to have 60% of their vote be "yes".

Illinois Appellate Court
Illinois Appellate Court justices hold ten-year terms.

1st district (Gordon vacancy)
A vacancy was created by the retirement of Joseph Gordon. Shelly A. Harris was elected to fill it. This was a special election as Gordon's term would have ended in 2014.

Democratic primary

Republican primary
The Republican primary was cancelled, as no candidates filed to run.

General election

1st district (Murphy vacancy)
A vacancy was created by the death of Michael J. Murphy. Democrat John B. Simon was elected to fill the vacancy. This was a regular election, as Murphy's term would have ended in 2014.

Democratic primary

Republican primary
The Republican primary was cancelled, as no candidates filed to run.

General election

1st district (Steele vacancy)
After the retirement of John O. Steele in January 2013, Shelly A. Harris as appointed to fill the vacancy. However, Harris did not seek reelection in 2014, instead running for the seat left vacant by the retirement of Joseph Gordon. Democrat John B. Simon was elected to fill the seat. This was a special election, as Steele's term ended in 2018.

Democratic primary

Republican primary
The Republican primary was cancelled, as no candidates filed to run.

General election

2nd district (Bowman vacancy) 
A vacancy was created by the 2012 death of John J. Bowman. Michael J. Burke was elected to fill the vacancy, running unopposed in both the Democratic primary and general election. This was a special election, as Bowman's term ended in 2020.

Democratic primary

Republican primary
The Republican primary was cancelled, as no candidates filed to run.

General election

4th district (McCullough vacancy) 
Incumbent Republican was appointed December 19, 2012 to fill the vacancy left by the death of John T. McCullough. She was reelected, running unopposed in both the Republican primary and general election. This was a regular election, as McCullough's term ended in 2014.

Democratic primary
The Democratic primary was cancelled, as no candidates filed to run.

Republican primary

General election

Retention elections
To be retained, judges were required to have 60% of their vote be "yes".

Lower courts

Lower courts also saw judicial elections.

References

Judicial
2014